{{Infobox comics story arc 
|title          = The Great Darkness Saga
|image          = Great Darkness Saga TPB.jpg
|caption        = {{Descript-cvr|Legion of Super-Heroes: The Great Darkness Saga TPB'|||1989}}. Art by Keith Giffen.
|publisher      = DC Comics
|startmo        = August
|startyr        = 1982
|endmo          = December
|endyr          = 1982
|titles         = Legion of Super-Heroes vol. 2, #287, #290–294, Annual #1 and #3,Booster Gold #32
|notable        = y
|main_char_team = Legion of Super-HeroesDarkseid
|writers        = Paul LevitzKeith Giffen
|artists        = 
|pencillers     = Keith GiffenLarry Mahlstedt
|inkers         = Larry Mahlstedt 
|TPB            = The Legion of Super-Heroes: The Great Darkness Saga HC
|ISBN           = 978-1-4012-2961-0
|TPB1           = The Legion of Super-Heroes: The Great Darkness Saga TPB
|ISBN1          = 0930289439
|cat            = Legion of Super-Heroes
|sortkey        = Great Darkness Saga
}}
"The Great Darkness Saga" is a five-issue American comic book story arc featuring the Legion of Super-Heroes. It was written by Paul Levitz, with art by Keith Giffen and Larry Mahlstedt. Published by DC Comics in 1982, the arc first appears in Legion of Super-Heroes vol. 2, #290–294. It is notable for featuring appearances by virtually every living past and present Legionnaire as of 1982, as well as most of the team's 30th-century allies, including the Legion of Substitute Heroes, the Wanderers, the Heroes of Lallor, and the 20th-century Kryptonian refugee Dev-Em. The heroes battle an immensely powerful being shrouded in darkness, ultimately revealed to be the ancient ruler of Apokolips, Darkseid.

Plot

In the 30th century, Legion of Super-Heroes co-founder Cosmic Boy leads a group of Legionnaires to investigate attacks on the Museum of the Mystic Arts and the Tower of London, both located on Earth. Included in the squad is 20th-century member Superboy (the legendary Superman as a teenager) and the latest addition to the team—Jacques Foccart, the new Invisible Kid.Jacques Foccart acquired the power of invisibility and joined the Legion in Legion of Super-Heroes vol. 2, Annual #1 (1982). At each site they are attacked by beings of great power, both of whom are shrouded in darkness and mention that they are servants of their "Master" who controls the "Great Darkness". Through the use of a teleportation warp, the beings escape with two stolen items: a mystical wand from the museum and the sword Excalibur from the Tower of London. When a third Servant attempts to steal the Orb of Orthanax from the Institute of Parapsychological Phenomena of Talok VIII, she is captured. However, a fourth Servant appears via another teleportation warp and absconds with the Orb. At his unknown base of operations, the Master absorbs the power contained within each of the stolen artifacts. The captured Servant is taken back to Legion headquarters. When she is brought in close proximity to Invisible Kid's younger sister Danielle Foccart, who has been possessed by the rogue artificial intelligence Computo, Danielle's brain activity spikes. In effect, the Servant causes the unconscious Computo to have a nightmare.

Through genetic testing, Mon-El and Dream Girl determine that the captured Servant is an inanimate "reverse-DNA" clone of Lydea Mallor, Shadow Lass' ancestor and a 20th-century heroine of Talok VIII. Meanwhile, on the planet Avalon, the fourth Servant frees the immensely powerful Mordru,Mordru loses his power upon being buried underground. – Adventure Comics #369–370 (June–July 1968). the mightiest wizard in the universe and arguably the Legion's most powerful enemy. Just as Mordru is about to destroy the Servant, the Master appears and quickly defeats him. Shortly thereafter on the prison planet Takron-Galtos, the Legionnaires discover that the Time Trapper — another powerful Legion foe — has been drained of his cosmic time-manipulation abilities by the Master as well.

Dream Girl's precognitive abilities allow her to foresee the Servants attacking her sister, the sorceress known as the White Witch, on their homeworld Naltor. She and a squad of Legionnaires travel there and prevent one of the Servants from kidnapping the White Witch. During the attack, Invisible Kid seizes the opportunity to journey into one of the beings' teleportation warps and take the battle directly to the Master. He confronts the Master, who is amused by the notion that the young hero is presumptuous enough to confront him. The Master blasts him with energy beams from his eyes, and warps him back to Naltor. Having seen the Master's real face, Invisible Kid is frightened on such a fundamental level that a large stripe of his jet black hair turns white permanently.

In the midst of the crisis, the Legion holds its long-delayed election, choosing Dream Girl as its new leader. She leads a squad of Legionnaires to the Sorcerers' World, where they repel an attack by the Master and several of his Servants. Mon-El confronts the Master directly and immediately recognizes him, but is easily defeated. The Master then reads his mind, learning that Mon-El recognized him because of all that the Legionnaire witnessed during his many centuries in the Phantom Zone.Mon-El spent a thousand years in the Phantom Zone to avoid dying after being exposed to lead, which is fatal to natives of the planet Daxam. – Superboy #89 (June 1961); Adventure Comics #305 (February 1963). Additionally, the Master learns of Mon-El's homeworld, Daxam. The sorcerers cast a spell intended to defend them against the Master, and they surprisingly conjure a humanoid baby. Meanwhile, on Earth, the three Legion founders (Cosmic Boy, Saturn Girl, and Lightning Lad) determine that two of the Servants are reverse-DNA clones of Superman and one of the Guardians of the Universe. Shocked that the Master is able to clone and harness the power of two of the mightiest beings in history, the founders send out a general alarm, calling all active and reserve Legionnaires to duty.

The Legionnaires manage to locate what turns out to be the Master's homeworld. Engaging the Servants in battle, Wildfire destroys the Guardian clone, while Element Lad exposes the Superman clone to gold kryptonite, allowing Timber Wolf to destroy him. Afterward, Brainiac 5 recognizes the Master's homeworld, and is able to deduce his true identity. Meanwhile, the Master has travelled to Daxam. Having added the powers of Mordru, the Time Trapper and others to his own abilities, he transposes Daxam with his own homeworld. Consequently, Daxam's three billion natives each gain powers equal to those of Superman or Mon-El, and all of them fall under the thrall of the Master, who is determined to conquer the entire universe. At the villain's command, the Daxamites use their powers to physically reshape the planet until it has been sculpted in the image of the Master himself: the ancient New Gods tyrant, Darkseid.

Brainiac 5 is the only Legionnaire (other than Mon-El) with any knowledge of Darkseid or his homeworld, Apokolips. Once he briefs Dream Girl, she sends out a second general alarm to all of the Legion's super-powered allies, including Supergirl (who resides in the 20th century) and the Legion of Substitute Heroes. Throughout United Planets territory, the Kryptonian intelligence agent Dev-Em, the Heroes of Lallor, the Wanderers, the Substitute Heroes and the Legionnaires all struggle to hold back the onslaught of attacking Daxamites. On Takron-Galtos, a de-powered Chameleon Boy fends off an attack from a Daxamite child by using judo to toss him into a cell with Validus, the mysterious childlike creature who is the most powerful member of the Fatal Five.The Daxamite child, Ol-Vir, would subsequently join the Legion of Super-Villains. – Legion of Super-Heroes vol. 3, #1 (August 1984).

As the humanoid child inexplicably ages at an accelerated rate, the White Witch casts a spell transporting the people on Daxam to Apokolips and vice versa. She is forcibly aided by a powerful unknown entity. When Darkseid tries to seize the child, the entity completes the aging process and reveals itself to be Darkseid's ancient enemy Izaya, Highfather of the New Gods from the planet New Genesis. Highfather transforms the last remaining Servant into a perfect clone of Darkseid's son Orion, who is destined to someday destroy his father. Before fading into nothingness, Highfather summons Superboy and Supergirl to the battlefield above Apokolips, with his power allowing the Kryptonian cousins to maintain their abilities under a red sun. Darkseid destroys the Orion clone and sends Superboy back to the 20th century. He then becomes so preoccupied with battling Supergirl and the other Legionnaires that he loses mental control of the Daxamites, who begin to make their way toward the planet. Realizing that he cannot defeat three billion Daxamites, Darkseid concedes defeat and vanishes, taking Apokolips with him. As he departs, he declares that he has left the Legionnaires with the "curse of darkness" which will destroy them from within, promising "that which is purest of you shall be the first to go". In the aftermath of the crisis, the White Witch is inducted into the Legion, while Light Lass decides to quit.

Epilogue
Months later, a pregnant Saturn Girl goes into labor in the hospital satellite Medicus One, preparing to give birth to the child she shares with her husband Lightning Lad. During the delivery, the satellite is mysteriously enshrouded in darkness, but Saturn Girl gives birth to a healthy baby boy. She is thrilled but slightly surprised, for during her pregnancy she occasionally thought that she was sensing two brain patterns. Unknown to anyone, there was a second child. During the delivery, Darkseid secretly kidnapped the infant and used his power to radically transform the child and send him years into the past, where he would encounter the Legion as Validus, unrecognized by his parents or anyone else. Thus, Darkseid declares triumphantly that his curse is fulfilled.Some time later, Saturn Girl and Lightning Lad discover Validus' true identity, and Darkseid restores him to normal. – Legion of Super-Heroes vol. 3, Annual #2 (1986).

Continuity
Following the events of the Zero Hour mini-series, this storyline and all other Legion stories predating October 1994 were removed from continuity. However, a new incarnation of the original Legion was introduced in 2007, in "The Lightning Saga" storyline in the Justice League of America and Justice Society of America titles. DC writer Geoff Johns later stated that this incarnation of the Legion shares the same history as the original Legion up to the events of Crisis on Infinite Earths, including the events of "The Great Darkness Saga". Moreover, when DC released its post-Infinite Crisis version of Darkseid's origin in 2008, "The Great Darkness Saga" was listed as one of the character's "essential storylines", strongly suggesting that the events of this tale were included in post-Infinite Crisis continuity. Additionally, a subsequent Legion tale explicitly referred to "The Great Darkness Saga" in general, and Darkseid's victory over Mordru (on the planet Avalon) in particular.

Validus and the other Fatal Five members were among the villains in Superboy-Prime's incarnation of the Legion of Super-Villains, as seen in the Final Crisis: Legion of 3 Worlds mini-series. However, Garridan Ranzz (the infant who was abducted by Darkseid in the original continuity) was recently depicted as a young child living with his parents Saturn Girl and Lightning Lad, and his twin brother Graym. Thus, it appears that Validus and Garridan are not the same being in current continuity.

During one of his missions to protect the timeline, Booster Gold arrived on Daxam at the beginning of the Great Darkness Saga—he was meant to arrive there three days before the war began, but misread his instructions—in order to recover the helmet of Doctor Fate to prevent Darkseid acquiring it. He departed Daxam along with Rani, an orphan girl who became his adopted daughter.

In September 2011, The New 52 rebooted DC's continuity. In this new timeline, there appears to have been little (if any) effect on this story arc, and the tale is still firmly within current continuity. In a New 52 Legion story, a Daxamite official remarked that the people of his world "still mourn how Darkseid used us for violence", an apparent reference to the events of "The Great Darkness Saga". In a subsequent tale, the Legion was confronted with a massive interplanetary crisis. Cosmic Boy described it by exclaiming that "[t]he Legion hasn't faced anything this awful on so many worlds since the Great Darkness!" In her response to his statement, Shadow Lass similarly mentions Darkseid, the Servants and the rampage of the enthralled Daxamites.

Collected editions

The story is collected in the trade paperback Legion of Super-Heroes: The Great Darkness Saga. First printed in 1989, it includes a 7-page prologue from issue #287 and the epilogue from Annual #3, and a replica of a team poster from the same period. A second printing was released in August 2002. 

A hardcover "Deluxe Edition" was published in November 2010, including issues before and after the main "Saga" (#284–296 and Annual'' #1), but excluding the epilogue story and poster. The hardcover also includes the script for the first part and character designs by Giffen. DC has announced a trade paperback edition shipping February 2013.

Reception
The story has been called by Medium as "the franchise's most significant story". It also hailed the saga as helping with the development of how Darkseid was viewed by showing that he was "capable of anchoring a massive, complex plot as the uber-antagonist". Gizmodo has stated that the story "made the Legion of Super-Heroes one of the best-selling franchises of the early '80s".

References

External links

Comics by Keith Giffen
Comics by Paul Levitz